Thomas Fairfax, 1st Viscount Fairfax of Emley JP (1575 – 23 December 1636) was an English landowner and politician who sat in the House of Commons at various times between 1601 and 1626. He was created Viscount Fairfax  in the Peerage of Ireland in 1629. He "erected a mansion on Bishophill (York) early in Elizabeth's reign".

Early life
Fairfax was the only son and heir of Sir William Fairfax of Gilling Castle and Walton, Yorkshire, by his second wife Jane Stapleton, daughter and heiress of Brian Stapleton of Burton Joyce. He attended school at Gilling and entered Caius College, Cambridge in 1590. He succeeded his father to the estates of Gilling and Walton in 1597 and was a sheep farmer and an encloser.

Career
In 1600 he was commissioner for musters for the West Riding of Yorkshire. In 1601, he was elected Member of Parliament for Boroughbridge. He was a J.P. for the North Riding of Yorkshire by 1603 and was knighted in April 1603. From July 1603 he was a  member of the council in the north, and was vice-president of the council in the north in 1608 and 1616.

In 1621, he was elected MP for Hedon. He was re-elected MP for Hedon in 1624, 1625, and 1626. From 1627 to 1628, he was High Sheriff of Yorkshire. He was created Viscount Fairfax on 10 January 1629.

Personal life
Fairfax married Catherine Constable, daughter of Sir Henry Constable of Burton Constable in 1594 and had six sons and five daughters. She was an open Catholic and was convicted of recusancy at regular intervals from 1599 until her death. She does not appear to have been fined, which may be attributable to Fairfax's friendship with Sir Arthur Ingram, Secretary to the Council of the North, and collector, for a time, of recusancy fines. She also employed Catholic maids and escaped penalty for this; and although it was also an offence, at least two of the sons went abroad to Catholic colleges. Before her death in 1626, they were the parents of at least eleven children, including:

 Thomas Fairfax, 2nd Viscount Fairfax (–1641), who married Alathea Howard, daughter of Sir Philip Howard (eldest son of Lord William Howard, a son Thomas Howard, 4th Duke of Norfolk).
 Hon. Henry Fairfax of Bridlington (d. 1650), who married Frances Barker, daughter of Henry Barker of Hurst.
 Hon. William Fairfax of Lythe, who married Abigail (née Cholmeley) Waterhouse (widow of Sir Edward Waterhouse), daughter of John Barker of Ipswich. After her death, he married Mary Cholmeley, daughter of Marmaduke Cholmeley of Brandsby.
 Hon. Nicholas Fairfax of Acton (d. 1657), who married Isabel Beckwith, daughter and co-heiress of Thomas Beckwith of Acton.
 Hon. Jane Fairfax, who married Cuthbert Morley in 1634.
 Hon. Margaret Fairfax, who married Watkinson Payler of Thoralby and, after his death, John Hotham of Scorborough.
 Hon. Katherine Fairfax (d. 1666/7), who married Robert Stapleton of Wighill in 1622. After his death, she married, as his second wife, Sir Matthew Boynton, 1st Baronet in 1636. After his death, she married, as his second wife, Sir Arthur Ingram (first son of Sir Arthur Ingram of Temple Newsam) in 1647. Her fourth marriage was to William Wickham of Roxby in 1657.
 Hon. Mary Fairfax, who married Sir Thomas Layton of Layton and Sexhow.
 Hon. Dorothy Fairfax (d. 1686), who married, as his second wife, John Ingram (second son of Sir Arthur Ingram of Temple Newsam). After his death, she married Sir Thomas Norcliffe of Langton, in 1639.

In 1627, Fairfax remarried to Lady Mary Bamburgh, widow of Sir William Bamburgh, 1st Baronet of Howsham, and daughter of Sir Robert Forth of Butley, Suffolk.

Fairfax died at Howsham at the age of about 61 and was buried at Scrayingham. His widow, died March 1638/9.

Descendants
Through his third son William, he was a grandfather of William Fairfax, 8th Viscount Fairfax (d. 1738), who married Elizabeth Gerard (a daughter of Capt. Gerard), parents of Hon. Alathea Fairfax (wife of Ralph Pigott of Whitton) and Charles Gregory Fairfax, 9th Viscount Fairfax (d. 1772). He married the Hon. Elizabeth Constable, widow of William Constable, 4th Viscount of Dunbar and eldest daughter of Hugh Clifford, 2nd Baron Clifford of Chudleigh in 1719. On the death of the 9th Viscount Fairfax, the Viscountcy of Fairfax became extinct. After the death of his only surviving child, Hon. Anne Fairfax in 1793, the Gilling Castle estates passed to her first cousin once removed, Charles Gregory Pigott later Fairfax.

References

1575 births
1636 deaths
16th-century English people
17th-century English nobility
Viscounts in the Peerage of Ireland
Peers of Ireland created by Charles I
Alumni of Gonville and Caius College, Cambridge
English landowners
High Sheriffs of Yorkshire
English MPs 1601
English MPs 1621–1622
English MPs 1624–1625
English MPs 1625
English MPs 1626
Thomas
Members of the Parliament of England for Hedon